"Guarded" is a song by American heavy metal band Disturbed. It was released on June 28, 2005, as a promotional single for their third studio album, Ten Thousand Fists. "Guarded" was the first single featuring their new bassist John Moyer. The track is featured in the soundtrack of the film Saw III, and on the video game soundtrack of MX vs. ATV Untamed.

Lyrical themes
According to vocalist David Draiman, "Guarded" is about how his lifestyle forces him to guard himself. He said, "It's a song that reflects what choosing this life forces certain people to do in a certain way — you have to remain guarded on a certain level."

Release
"Guarded" was released to radio stations as a promotional single on June 28, 2005. David Draiman said, "[The song] was put out there to just whet everybody's appetite. It's one of the more aggressive tracks on the record, just to remind everybody where we came from and who we are. Kind of give back to the core a little bit."

Chart positions

Personnel
 David Draiman – vocals
 Dan Donegan – guitars, electronics
 John Moyer – bass
 Mike Wengren – drums

References

2005 singles
2005 songs
Disturbed (band) songs
Songs written by Dan Donegan
Songs written by David Draiman
Songs written by Mike Wengren
Song recordings produced by Johnny K
Reprise Records singles